High Wall is a 1947 American film noir starring Robert Taylor, Audrey Totter and Herbert Marshall. It was directed by Curtis Bernhardt from a screenplay by Sydney Boehm and Lester Cole, based on a play by Alan R. Clark and Bradbury Foote.

Plot
Steven Kenet catches his unfaithful wife Helen in the apartment of Willard I. Whitcombe, her boss, and she is strangled to death. He attempts to commit suicide by driving his car into the river, even though they have a six-year-old son. Kenet survives but is sent to the county psychiatric hospital for evaluation to determine if he is sane enough to be charged with murder. He has no memory of what happened, likely due to a pre-existing brain injury from the war.

Dr. Ann Lorrison takes an interest in his case, and in him. Surgery could cure Kenet's brain injury, but he refuses to consent to it, preferring a life in an insane asylum to a probable murder conviction. However, when Lorrison informs him that because his mother has died, his son will be sent to an orphanage, Kenet changes his mind. (Lorrison herself has obtained temporary custody of the child.)

Henry Cronner, janitor of the apartment building, attempts to blackmail Whitcombe. After being rebuffed, Cronner goes to see Kenet, hinting he can save him but withholding details until Kenet can pay. Whitcombe then sends Cronner plummeting to his death down the building's elevator shaft.

Kenet undergoes "narcosynthesis"—a light dose of sodium pentothal—to help him remember what happened. He recalls blacking out just as his hands were around Helen's neck and later regaining consciousness to find her dead body. Kenet escapes from the hospital and, taking a reluctant Lorrison along, breaks into Whitcombe's apartment. He recreates the scene, in hopes of jogging his memory, then returns to the hospital before he is missed.

Whitcombe visits him there and provokes Kenet by confessing to the two murders; as he had hoped, he is attacked by Kenet, making the latter look like a homicidal lunatic. In desperation, Kenet breaks out of the hospital again. He manages to get to Whitcombe and subdues him. Under sodium pentothal Lorrison administers, Whitcombe recounts how he had tried to part ways with Helen Kenet after finding her husband unconscious in his apartment, but she threatened to cause a scandal and ruin any chance of him becoming a partner in his firm.

Taken into custody, Whitcombe is told that anything he said under the truth serum can not be used against him. He vows to get a lawyer and be cleared. Kenet, meantime, is free to go.

Cast
 Robert Taylor as Steven Kenet
 Audrey Totter as Dr. Ann Lorrison
 Herbert Marshall as Willard I. Whitcombe
 Dorothy Patrick as Helen Kenet
 H. B. Warner as Mr. Slocum
 Warner Anderson as Dr. George Poward
 Moroni Olsen as Dr. Philip Dunlap
 John Ridgely as Asst. District Attorney David Wallace
 Morris Ankrum as Dr. Stanley Griffin
 Elisabeth Risdon as Mrs. Kenet, Steven's mother
 Vince Barnett as Henry Cronner
 Jonathan Hale as Emory Garrison
 Charles Arnt as Sidney X. Hackle, Steven's court-appointed lawyer
 Lisa Golm as Dr. Golm

Reception
The film earned $1,553,000 in the US and Canada and $1,065,000 elsewhere resulting in a loss of $101,000.

Critical response
A contemporary review in The New York Times said: "As straight movie melodrama, employing modern psychotherapy, High Wall is a likely lot of terrors, morbid and socially cynical. Just the thing for your holiday entertainment—unless, of course, you are sane."

In 1984 writer Spencer Selby called High Wall "stylish, representative of late forties noir thrillers."

In 2006 film critic Dennis Schwartz called it "a tepid and chatty psychological melodrama that is embellished with black-and-white film noir visuals by the adept camerawork of Nicolas Vogel," but thought the main cast "adequate but too bland to convince us that their romance was possible. Robert Taylor's personal despair was more like angst in a soap opera than film noir. The film's biggest faults were that it was never convincing as a mystery story, that the romance story was more Hollywood fantasy than real, that the truth serum is so casually accepted as the answer to establishing the truth and that brain surgery can so easily cure Taylor of his mental disorder."

References

External links
 
 
 
 
 

1947 films
1947 crime drama films
American black-and-white films
American crime drama films
American films based on plays
Film noir
Films about amnesia
Films about psychiatry
Films directed by Curtis Bernhardt
Films produced by Robert Lord (screenwriter)
Films scored by Bronisław Kaper
Metro-Goldwyn-Mayer films
1940s English-language films
1940s American films